Marko Modic (born 26 August 1958 in Ljubljana) is a Slovenian photographer, painter and visual artist from Ljubljana, Slovenia.
Photographic and artistic circles of the world attributed Marko Modic a special place because of his unique and colorful works of art.

Biography 
In 1976 he got his first camera Praktica from his father. At the beginning he worked in black and white photographs and later embarked on a more complex photo-montage that he uses also in his work today. Photograph is used occasionally as a basis on which then he draws a picture. In his work are photographs, paintings, books, as well as performances. Modic's enigmatic photographic works show an extreme sensibility towards perception and use of colors. He captures details of everyday objects or places and uncommonly presents them in insolation, neither in a content nor in perspective-evoking ambiguous interpretation and curiosity...

In 1988 Marko Modic won "Zlata ptica" ["Golden Bird"], a Slovenian award for extraordinary achievements in the fields of cultural creation.
Marko Modic has exhibited his photographs widely at home, in Italy, Ecuador, Argentina, UK, Canada... In 2011 he had an exhibition "Written on skin of the Earth" in Tivoli Park in Ljubljana, Slovenia and in Whyte Museum of the Canadian Rockies, Banff, Canada.

At the end of 70's and in the early 80's he was an active member of Ljubljana Cave Exploration Society (DZRJL), took part in high mountain deep cave exploration, was the editor of the society's journal Glas podzemlja [Voice of the Underground] and contributed to design and contents of other caving publications.

Marko Modic lives in Ljubljana, Slovenia (2019).

Selection of exhibitions and works

Solo exhibitions 

 1984 Cankarjev dom (Cultural and Congress Center), Ljubljana, Slovenia (performance included)
 1987 Richard Demarco Gallery, Edinburgh, UK
 1988 Galerija Dante • Marino Cettina, Umag, Croatia
 1988 Moderna galerija (Museum of Modern Art), Ljubljana, Slovenia
 1990 Centre Culturel et d’information de Yugoslavie, Paris, France
 1991 Fundacion Guayasamin, Quito, Ecuador
 1991 Espace Franco – Americain, Le Mejan, R.l.P., Arles, France
 1992 Folklore Olga Fisch, Quito, Ecuador
 1993 Moderna galerija (Museum of Modern Art), Ljubljana, Slovenia
 1995 Cankarjev dom (Cultural and Congress Center), Ljubljana, Slovenia
 1996 Teatro San Martin, Buenos Aires, Argentina
 1996 Barbican Centre, London, UK
 1998 Ikona Photo gallery, Venezia, Italy
 1998 Mestna galerija, Ljubljana, Slovenia
 1999 Mücsarnok, Palace of Art, Budapest, Hungary
 1999 Palisady gallery, Bratislava, Slovakia
 1999 Milano Libri, Milano, Italy
 2002 Galerie Perpétuel, Frankfurt, Germany
 2004 Equrna Gallery, Ljubljana, Slovenia
 2004 Euro Center, Ljubljana, Slovenia
 2004 Galleria Regionale d'Arte Contemporanea Luigi Spazzapan, Gradisca d'Isonzo, Italy
 2005 – 2012 The Venetian, Scorze (VE), Italy
 2010 Kosovelov dom, Sezana, Slovenia
 2010 Atelje Mikado, Ljubljana, Slovenia
 2011 Whyte Museum, Banff, Canada
 2011 Jakopičev drevored Tivoli, Ljubljana, Slovenia
 2011 Atelje Galerija, Ljubljana, Slovenia
 2012 Galerija Zala, Ljubljana, Slovenia
 2012 Slovenian Scientific Institut, Wien, Austria
 2014 The Art photo gallery, Trieste, Italy
 2015 Galerija Jakopič, Ljubljana, Slovenia
 2015 Mladinska knjiga, Ljubljana, Slovenia

Group exhibitions 

 1986 B’Bienale, Rotonda, Thessaloniki, Greece
 1988 XV Fotoforumm, Fotografi di Alpe Adria, Auditorium, Spilimbergo, Italy
 1998 Galaxia, Casa Veneta, Muggia, Italy
 1989 YU Documenta 89, Olympic Center Skenderija, Sarajevo, Bosnia
 1989 Alcune espressioni, Villa Simion, Spinea, Italy
 1989 Utopies 89, Grand Palais: L’Europe des créateurs, Paris, France
 1990 Soirées Est-Ouest, Musée National d’Art Moderne, Centre G.Pompidou, Paris, France
 1990 Ca dèbloque à l’est, Espace photographique Contretype, Bruxelles, Belgium
 1990 Soirées Est – Ouest, Galerie Donguy, Paris, France
 1991 Identités méditerranéennes, Aix-en-Provence, France
 1994 Alteridades, Sala Gòtica de I’IEI, Lérida, Spain
 1995 Out post, Venezia, Italy
 1999 Dal Dahgerrotipo al Digitale, Galleria Sagittaria, Pordenone, Italy
 2003 Jubilaeum, Galerie Perpétuel, Frankfurt, Germany
 2009 Drawing in Slovenia, Mestna galerija (Municipal Gallery) Ljubljana, Slovenia
 2010 Revolutionary Voices, New York Public Library, New York City
 2010 Photographs from Marino Cettina Collection, Museum of Modern and Contemporary Art, Rijeka, Croatia
 2010 Drawing in Slovenia, Museum of Contemporary Art, Zagreb, Croatia
 2010 Drawing in Slovenia (1940–2009), Maribor Art Gallery, Maribor, Slovenia
 2010 Drawing in Slovenia (1940–2009), Mestna galerija (Municipal Gallery) Ljubljana, Slovenia
 2011 ZDSLU Group exhibition, Gallery of »Jožef Stefan« Institute, Ljubljana, Slovenia
 2011 Between Pictorialism and Abstraction, Velenje Gallery, Velenje, Slovenia
 2011 Between Pictorialism and Abstraction, Kosova graščina, Jesenice, Slovenia
 2012 NSK 1984–1992, Chelsea Space, London, Great Britain
 2012 Time for a New State / NSK Folk Art, Tate Modern, London, Great Britain
 2012 Selection of photographs from Group Junij Art collection, Museum of Architecture and Design, Ljubljana, Slovenia
 2012 New photography – reality, Savin Art Salon, Žalec, Slovenia
 2013 50 years of Ljubljana City Art Gallery, Mestna galerija (Municipal Gallery) Ljubljana, Slovenia
 2013 Photo-Imago 1983–2013, Museo d'Arte Moderno Ugo Cara, Muggia, Italy
 2015 NSK from Kapital to Capital, Modern Gallery, Ljubljana, Slovenia
 2016 NSK from Kapital to Capital, Van Abbe Museum, Eidhoven, The Netherlands
 2016 NSK from Kapital to Capital, Garage Museum of Contemporary Art, Moscow, Russia
 2017 The Eightiews / The Heritage 1989, Modern Gallery, Ljubljana, Slovenia
 2017 NSK from Kapital to Capital, Museo Nacional Centro de Arte Reina Sofia, Madrid, Spain

Books and catalogs 

 1988 Marko Modic: Ekran sanjskih podob (The Screen of Oneiric Images), Moderna galerija (Modern gallery), Ljubljana, Slovenia
 1990 Marko Modic: Moderna galerija (Modern gallery), Ljubljana, Slovenia
 1992 Marko Modic: A Fish Book – Galapagos, Villegas Editores, Quito, Ecuador
 1992 Marko Modic: Tauromaquia
 1993 Marko Modic: Texturon, Moderna galerija (Modern gallery), Ljubljana, Slovenia
 1994 Marko Modic: Ljubljana – Luč in dan (Ljubljana – Light and day), Colibri, Ljubljana, Slovenia
 1995 Marko Modic: Ratio Cut, Cankarjev dom, Ljubljana, Slovenia
 1998 Marko Modic: Excentrix, EWO, Ljubljana, Slovenia
 1999 Marko Modic: Alluminations, Mestna galerija (Municipal gallery) Ljubljana, Slovenia
 2001 Marko Modic: Unseen, Die Gestalten Verlag, Berlin, Germany 
 2006 Marko Modic: Oyster Doubt, Logos, Modena, Italy
 2015 Marko Modic: The fifth element, Gallery Jakopič, Ljubljana, Slovenia

Performances 

 1984: Extreme, Auditorium Zanon, Udine, Italy
 1986: Massacrefish I, Künstler Werkstatte, München, Germany
 1987: Massacrefish II, Galerija Dante – Marino Cettina, Umag, Croatia
 1987: Massacrefish III, Craighill Cottage, Blebocraigs, Cupar, Scotland
 1988: Eau & Feu, Galerija Dante – Marino Cettina, Umag, Croatia
 1988: Missa Elementorum, SKC, Beograd, Yugoslavia
 1989: Pulsus, Museum of XIV Winter Olympic Games, Sarajevo, Bosnia
 1990: Mostromo, Katedrala sv. Vlaha, Dubrovnik, Croatia
 1994: Ratio Cut, Ca Nova, Oira di Crevoladossola, Italy

TV and video 

 1985: TV Ljubljana, Miha Vipotnik: Verging on the impossible
 1988: TV Ljubljana, Marina Grzinic, Aina Smid: Viziorama – Mašinerija slike
 1988: Radovan Cok: Albedo (performance for one camera)
 1988: TV Koper, Silvio Odogaso: Marko Modic, L'intelligenza della bellezza
 1988: BBC North: Rough Guide, West MCMLXXXVIII
 1993: TV Ljubljana, Stane Sumrak, Koketiranje s sivino možganske skorje
 1994: AGRFT & Moderna galerija Ljubljana, Gregor Vesel: Texturon

References

External links 
  Marko Modic
  Whyte Museum
  Atelje Galerija
  Radio Student
  Kibla Multimedia, Fotografija skozi medije
  Exhibition "Written on the skin of the Earth"

1958 births
Living people
Slovenian painters
Slovenian male painters
Slovenian video artists
Slovenian photographers
Slovenian performance artists
Artists from Ljubljana